Çayıryazı can refer to:

 Çayıryazı, Çay
 Çayıryazı, Üzümlü